Antun Kanižlić (20 November 1699, in Požega – 24 August 1777, in Požega) was a Croatian Jesuit and poet.

After finishing the gymnasium in Požega, he continued his education in Zagreb, Vienna, and Leoben. He studied theology for three years in Graz and graduated theology in Graz and Trnava.

He wrote chiefly religious books, prayer books and translated from German into Croatian.

Works

 Sveta Rožalija, full title Sveta Rožalija Panormitanska divica nakićena i ispivana po Antunu Kanižliću Požežaninu
 Kamen pravi, smutnje velike

Sources
KANIŽLIĆ, Antun at lzmk.hr 
Antun Kanižlić - hrvatski književnik 

1699 births
1777 deaths
18th-century Croatian poets
Habsburg Croats
People from Požega, Croatia
Croatian male poets
Baroque writers